Willey is a surname of British origin. It may refer to:

Alan Willey (actor) (1909–1961), Australian-American actor; later stage name Alan Marshal
Alan Willey (footballer, born 1941) (1941–2017), English forward
Alan Willey (footballer, born 1956), English striker and American soccer player
Arthur Willey (1867–1942), British zoologist
Arthur Wellesley Willey (1868–1923), English solicitor and M.P.
Basil Willey (1897–1978), British historian and literary critic
Calvin Willey (1776–1858), American politician
Carl Willey (1931–2009), American baseball player
Dave Willey (born 1963), American experimental musician and composer
David Willey (cricketer) (born 1990), British cricketer
David Willey (physicist) (born 1947), American physicist
Edward E. Willey (1910–1986), American politician
Frederick Willey (1910–1987), British politician
Gordon Willey (1913–2002), American archaeologist
Henry Willey (1824–1907), American lichenologist and newspaper editor
Hubert James Willey (1897–1948), British soldier
James Willey (born 1939), American composer
Kathleen Willey (born 1946), American political aide
N. B. Willey (1838–1921), American politician
Neil Willey (born 1976), British swimmer
Norm Willey (1927–2011), American football player
Peter Willey (born 1949), British cricketer
Ron Willey (1929–2004), Australian rugby league player and coach
Vernon Willey (1884–1982), British politician
Waitman T. Willey (1811–1900), American politician
Walt Willey (born 1951), American actor

See also
Willey (disambiguation)
Wiley (disambiguation)
Willy (disambiguation)

Surnames of British Isles origin
English toponymic surnames